The 1995–96 Eredivisieseason was contested by 18 teams. Ajax won the championship. From this season onwards a match win was rewarded with 3 points instead of 2.

League standings

Results

Relegation play-offs
In the promotion/relegation competition, eight entrants (six from this league and two from the Eredivisie) entered in two groups. The group winners were promoted to the Eredivisie.

See also
 1995–96 in Dutch football
 1995–96 Eerste Divisie
 1995–96 KNVB Cup

References
Notes

Sources
 Eredivisie official website - info on all seasons 
 RSSSF

Eredivisie seasons
Netherlands
1995–96 in Dutch football